Father Frédéric-Vincent Lebbe (19 August 1877 — 24 June 1940) was a Roman Catholic missionary to China whose advocacy led Pope Pius XI to appoint the first native Chinese bishops. Born in Belgium, he chose to become a Chinese citizen at a time when missionaries, like all Westerners, enjoyed legal privileges in China, including immunity from Chinese law. He was captured by the Chinese Communists in 1940 and died later that year.

Life and Works
Lebbe was born on 19 August 1877 in Ghent, Belgium into a devout Catholic family. His father was Flemish a public notary, and his mother was of half French and half English descent. He was the eldest son and was baptized under the name Frédéric. When he was 11 years old, he read about the martyrdom of French Catholic missionary Jean-Gabriel Perboyre, a member of the Lazarists, in Wuchang, China in 1840, inspiring him want to become a missionary in China. In 1895, in Paris, Lebbe entered the Lazarist order. While Lebbe was a seminary student in 1900, the Boxer Rebellion occurred in China, and the Belgian missionary Ferdinand Hamer was martyred in Inner Mongolia. Lebbe nonetheless decided to go to China to promote Catholicism.

In 1901, Lebbe followed Pierre-Marie-Alphonse Favier, Bishop of Beijing, to China. He was ordained in Beijing on 28 October 1901, and was then sent to do mission work in Xiaohan village of Wuqing County (now part of Tianjin Municipality) and elsewhere in the Beijing-Tianjin region. In 1903, Lebbe presided over the rebuilding of the Xiaohan church, damaged during the Boxer Rebellion.

Upon reaching China, Lebbe strove to study Chinese culture, and learned to read Chinese books, speak fluent standard Mandarin, and write beautiful calligraphy. Lebbe eventually dressed in Chinese clothes, lives according to Chinese customs, and interacted primarily with Chinese friends and coreligionists. In 1912, the Apostolic Vicariate of Tianjin was established, and Lebbe was able to achieve spectacular results in his miss work, being promoted to the position of vicar for the new Vicariate (a position second only to the Vicariate's Bishop). On 10 October 1915, Lebbe and the Chinese Catholics founded the Catholic newspaper  (益世報) in Tianjin's Nanshi District on Rongye Street (outside of the Concessions), which is considered one of the "Four Great Newspapers of the Republican period" (民国四大报刊). Lebbe's command of Chinese allowed him to interact with the Chinese intelligentsia of Tianjin, converting dozens and attracting the attention of many more, especially with lecture hall discussions on religion, ethics, and patriotism.

Along with Anthony Cotta (汤作霖), Lebbe criticized various foreign religious organizations for the practice of controlling Chinese Catholicism to the benefit of their home countries, proposing the slogan "Return China to the Chinese and the, Chinese will go to Christ", and actively promoted that the Vatican appoint bishops of Chinese nationality. For these actions, Lebbe drew the ire of his Lazarist superiors.

In 1916, the Laoxikai affair (老西開事件) occurred in Tianjin. The basis of the struggle was that the French Consul of Tianjin with the support of the Church leadership in Tianjin attempted to expand the French Concession by appropriating land adjacent to St. Joseph's Cathedral and incorporating it into the Concession. Yishibao published many objections to these actions, including one written by Lebbe himself, bringing Lebbe into conflict with Tianjin Bishop Paul-Marie Dumond. As a result of the disagreement, Lebbe was demoted and transferred Ningbo diocese in April 1920, and he soon afterwards returned to Europe. Nonetheless, the protests of Lebbe and Cotta to the Vatican influenced Pope Benedict XV's 1919 apostolic letter Maximum illud, which aimed to indigenize the Church in China and curb the worst abuses of Western missionaries, including actions undertaken in the interest of one's country rather than the Church as a whole.

While in Europe, Lebbe assisted Chinese students and engaged in missionary work among them, where he competed for their allegiance with a former leader in the Tianjin Student Union and Yishibao reporter, Zhou Enlai. He also helped establish the Society of Auxiliaries of the Missions and the Women Lay Auxiliaries of the Missions during this time. Lebbe continued to lobby the Vatican to reform the China mission, even meeting with the Pope to make his case, and he was influential in the appointment of the first six Chinese bishops, whose consecration he attended, on 28 October 1926 in St. Peter's Basilica. The six were Zhu Kaimin in Haimen (朱开敏,海门教区), Cheng Hede in Puqi (成和德, 蒲圻教区), Chen Guodi in Fenyang (陈国砥,汾阳教区), Zhao Huaiyi in Xuanhua (赵怀义, 宣化教区), Hu Ruoshan in Taizhou (胡若山, 台州教区), and Sun Dezhen in Anguo (孙德桢, 安国教区).

In 1927, Lebbe's applied for and was granted Chinese citizenship and returned to China in 1928, aiding Bishop Sun Dezhen in Anguo, Hebei and helping establish two Chinese religious orders, the Little Brothers of St. John the Baptist (Les Petits frères de Saint-Jean-Baptiste, 耀汉小兄弟会) and the Little Sisters of St. Theresa of the Holy Child (Les Petites soeurs de Sainte-Thérèse-de-l'Enfant-Jésus, 德来小姊妹会), the latter named for Saint Thérèse of Lisieux).

Lebbe strongly advocated on behalf of the Chinese people against Japanese imperialism. During the Battle of Rehe in 1933, Lebbe led his congregation to rescue and treat wounded soldiers. After the Second Sino-Japanese War broke out in 1937, Lebbe organized and led a Catholic battlefield rescue and relief team which aided wounded soldiers at Taihangshan (太行山) and Zhongtiaoshan (中条山), and led refugee relief efforts, including providing education for students whose schools had been closed by the fighting.

In the midst of a clash between Lu Chung-lin's Kuomintang forces and the Communist Eighth Route Army, Lebbe (who supported the KMT) was captured by the Communists on 9 March 1940 and held captive in Liao County, Taihang District of Shanxi Province (today's Zuoquan County). Treated as a Kuomintang spy, Lebbe endured six weeks of brainwashing and physical mistreatment, and was seriously ill when released more than 40 days later. He died of exhaustion at Geleshan in Chungking on 24 June 1940.

Legacy
Lebbe was instrumental in promoting the inculturation of the Catholic Church in China, a movement which was only partially underway when the new Communist regime expelled all foreign missionaries after 1949.

The Vincent Lebbe Archives are maintained at the Faculté de théologie at the l'Université Catholique de Louvain in Louvain, Belgium.

The case for Lebbe's beatification was opened in 1988 by the Little Brothers of St. John the Baptist of Taichung, Taiwan. Many schools and institutions bear his name, and he received official praise from the ROC government after his death, including a memorial tablet at the National Revolutionary Martyrs' Shrine in Taipei.

Writings
Oeuvres de Vincent Lebbe
Memoria sullo stato dell'evangelizzazione in Cina e sulla formazione del Clero indigeno, Sagra Congregazione De Propaganda Fide, Ponente, Rome 1922.
Que sera la Chine demain?, 1925
En Chine, il y a du nouveau, Paris 1930
Histoires chinoises, Louvain 1937

References

Further reading
 Jacques Leclercq, Thunder in the Distance. The Life of Père Lebbe, New York: Sheed & Ward, 1958, 322 p.
Huang Fadien, Le Père Lebbe et les Étudiants Chinois en Europe (1920-1927). Mémoire de licence en sciences historiques présenté à l'Université Catholique de Louvain, 1972
Vincent Thoreau, Le tonnerre qui chante au loin. Vie et mort du Père Lebbe, apôtre des Chinois (1877-1940), Bruxelles, 1990

External links
 
 http://www.vincentlebbe.net/
 https://www.youtube.com/watch?v=TOBK38saMac (in French)

Roman Catholic missionaries in China
Roman Catholic missionaries in Sichuan
Clergy from Ghent
1877 births
1940 deaths